Susanne Maria Schennach is an economist and professor at Brown University. She is an econometrician whose work focuses on measurement error.

Schennach has been an assistant editor at The Econometrics Journal, Econometric Theory, and Econometrica.

Early life and education
Schennach is a native of Innsbruck, and remains a citizen of Austria.

She received a B.A. in economics and French language and literature from Brandeis University in 1996, and a Ph.D. in economics from the Massachusetts Institute of Technology in 2000, where her advisers were Whitney Kent Newey and Thomas M. Stoker. Her thesis was titled "Estimation of Nonlinear Models with Measurement Error".

Career
Schennach was an assistant professor at the University of Chicago Department of Economics from 2000 to 2006, associate professor from 2006 to 2007, and professor from 2007 to 2011. Schennach has been a professor at Brown University since 2011.

Schennach's interest in measurement error grew out of a research product on productivity in the United States coal industry that she worked on as a graduate student.

She was named a Fellow of the Econometric Society in 2014. Schennach and coauthors Flávio Cunha and James Heckman were awarded the Frisch Medal in 2014 for their 2010 paper "Estimating the Technology of Cognitive and Noncognitive Skill Formation".

Selected research

References

External links

Austrian economists
Brown University faculty
University of Chicago faculty
Brandeis University alumni
MIT School of Humanities, Arts, and Social Sciences alumni
Living people
Year of birth missing (living people)
Austrian women economists
Writers from Innsbruck
Fellows of the Econometric Society